Anthony James Comber  (20 April 1927 – 6 July 2022) was Archdeacon of Leeds from 1982 to 1992.

Comber was vicar of Oulton from 1960 to 1969; and then of Hunslet from 1969 to 1977. He was Rector of Farnley from 1977 to 1982.

Comber died on 6 July 2022, at the age of 95.

Notes

1927 births
2022 deaths
Alumni of the University of Leeds
Archdeacons of Leeds
People educated at Leeds Grammar School